The 1975 World Sportscar Championship season was the 23rd season of FIA World Sportscar Championship motor racing. It featured the 1975 World Championship for Makes which was open to Group 5 Sports Cars and Group 4 Special GT Cars. It also included the FIA Cup for GT Cars and the FIA Cup for 2-Litre Cars. The three titles were contested concurrently over a nine race series which ran from 1 February to 12 July 1975.

Schedule

† Due to a lack of Group 5 entries, the FIA initially rescinded the championship status of the Daytona race. Several months after the event the FIA retroactively conferred championship status to the race and placed cars into the classes they would theoretically have entered.

Season results

Races

World Championship for Makes

Points towards the World Championship for Makes were awarded to the top 10 positions in each race in the order of 20-15-12-10-8-6-4-3-2-1. Points were awarded to the position gained by the highest placed car from each make with any positions filled by other cars from the same make not attracting points. No points were awarded to positions gained by cars other than Group 5 Sports Cars and Group 4 Special GT Cars.

Only the 7 best results were retained for championship classification.   Discarded points are shown (below) within brackets

FIA Cup for GT Cars

FIA Cup for 2-Litre Cars

Notes and references

External links
 1975 championship review at www.international-auto.com
 1975 championship points and race results at www.teamdan.com
 1975 championship race results at wspr-racing.com
 1975 championship images at www.racingsportscars.com

World Sportscar Championship seasons
World Sportscar